Jáder Rafael Obrian Arias (born 18 May 1995) is a Colombian footballer who currently plays as a winger for FC Dallas in MLS.

Career
Obrian spent time with Uniautónoma, Deportes Tolima, Cúcuta Deportivo and Águilas Doradas, before joining Dallas on 19 December 2020.

Career statistics

Club

References

External links
 

1995 births
Living people
Colombian footballers
Colombian expatriate footballers
Uniautónoma F.C. footballers
Deportes Tolima footballers
Cúcuta Deportivo footballers
Águilas Doradas Rionegro players
FC Dallas players
Expatriate soccer players in the United States
Colombian expatriate sportspeople in the United States
Association football wingers
People from Bolívar Department
Major League Soccer players